Colin Maiden Park is a New Zealand sports complex in the Auckland suburb of Glen Innes, about 10 kilometres south-east of the Auckland CBD. It is named in honour of Sir Colin Maiden, vice-chancellor of the University of Auckland from 1971 to 1994.

There are three cricket grounds and other sporting facilities in the park. The main ground, which has a capacity of 4,000, is the home of University RFC and Auckland University CC, and is one of the home grounds for the Auckland cricket team. The main cricket ground began to be used for first-class cricket in 1999 and as of April 2020 it has staged 28 of Auckland's first-class and 20 of Auckland's one-day matches. Auckland played the final of the Ford Trophy there in 2009–10 and 2014–15.

In 2014 the Auckland council took over the park as part of a condition of sale between the University and the Council. The purchase ensures the 20-hectare parkland and sports field complex remain in public ownership.

References

External links
 Cricinfo Profile
 Colin Maiden Park Auckland Cricket Association
 Colin Maiden Park Precinct Master Plan

Cricket grounds in New Zealand
Rugby union stadiums in New Zealand
Sports venues in Auckland
Parks in Auckland